Bike Itaú is a public bicycle sharing system in the city of Rio de Janeiro, Brazil.  It is run by PBSC Urban Solutions and started on the 20th of February 2018, and is sponsored by the municipal government of Rio de Janeiro in partnership with Banco Itaú.  The system replaces the old one, operated by Serttel a private concessionaire, that began operations in October 2011. The old bike sharing system had 4000 bicycles available at 400 rental stations located throughout several neighborhoods in the city. The rental stations are powered by solar panels.

Gallery

References

External links

 

Community bicycle programs
Cycling in Brazil
Transport in Rio de Janeiro (city)
Bicycle sharing in Brazil